All Work & No Play is the demo CD released by the Christian rock band Relient K in 1998. It caught the attention of dcTalk's Toby McKeehan, who subsequently signed them to Gotee Records.

Seven of the eleven tracks on this album were eventually remade on either the band's first or second full-length albums. "Cojack", "Register", "Be Rad", and "William" were never re-made for another album, unlike all the others, and are only available on this album.

Like most of Relient K's early work the songs make several references to pop-culture, including; * "K Car" refers to the Plymouth Reliant K, based on the K Car platform, for which the band is named, "I'm Lion-O" refers to the main character, Lion-O, of the 1980s cartoon Thundercats, "My Good Friend Charles" references the 1980s sitcom Charles in Charge, and in the song "K Car" uses the line "And Brandon Ebel just gave us a call" referring to the founder of the record label, Tooth & Nail Records.

The CD had a limited release by CREC records, the album cover was the same with different CD art. Only a limited number of the album were ever produced. CREC Records was given cease and desist order in 2005 to stop distribution of the album, and they complied.

On the cover of the album, there is a square around the K. In an interview, Matt Thiessen and Matt Hoopes talked about the Reliant K Car, and how they named the band. Matt Thiessen said they saw a rectangle around the K on the back of the car, and they said, "That would make a cool logo". Thiessen also pointed out that they were fifteen when they thought of that.

Track listing

Credits
Matt Thiessen – lead vocals, guitar
Matt Hoopes – guitar, backing vocals
Brian Pittman – bass guitar
Todd Frascone – drums

References

Relient K albums
1998 debut albums